2004–05 Croatian First League was the 14th season of the Croatian handball league since its independence and the fourth season of the First League format.

League table

First phase 
In the first part of the season, 16 teams played single-circuit league (15 matches). After 15 rounds the first six teams qualified for the Championship play-offs - playing for the Championship title and the remaining 10 in the Relegation play-offs - playing to stay in the league.

Championship play-offs 
Intermediate matches from the first part of the championship were transferred, and the clubs played three more times (15 matches).

Relegation play-offs 
Relegation play-offs determined the placement of clubs that were between 7th and 16th place in the first phase of the championship. 18 matches were played (double league system).

Final standings

Sources 
 Fredi Kramer, Dražen Pinević: Hrvatski rukomet = Croatian handball, Zagreb, 2009.; page 180
 hrt.hr, ljestvica i rezultati 1. dijela
hrt.hr, ljestvica i rezultati Lige 16
European Handball Federation

References

2004-05
handball
handball
Croatia